Tetraethoxymethane is a chemical compound which is formally formed by complete ethylation of the hypothetical orthocarbonic acid C(OH)4 (orthocarboxylic acid violates the Erlenmeyer rule and is unstable in free state).

History
Tetraethoxymethane was described the first time in 1864.

Synthesis 
The preparation of tetraethoxymethane from the highly toxic trichloronitromethane is known in the literature and achieves only yields of 46-49 to 58%:

The obvious synthetic route from tetrachloromethane does not provide the desired product, as in the homologous tetramethoxymethane.

Starting from the less toxic trichloroacetonitrile (compared with trichloronitromethane), higher yields can be obtained (up to 85%). An alternative reaction, bypassing problematic reactants, is the reaction of dialkyltin dialkoxides with carbon disulfide at elevated temperature in an autoclave:

A more recent synthesis starts directly from sodium ethoxide, tin(IV)chloride, and carbon disulfide.

Properties 
Tetraethoxymethane is a water-clear, aromatic or fruity smelling, liquid of low-viscosity which is unstable against strong acids and strong bases.

Uses 
Tetraethoxymethane can be used as a solvent and for the alkylation of CH-acidic compounds (e.g. phenols and carboxylic acids). In addition, it reacts with amines, enol ethers and sulfonamides, whereby spiro compounds can also be obtained. Spiro orthocarbonates (SOCs) are of some industrial interest, as they are used as additives for reducing shrinkage during the polymerization of epoxides (they are used as expanding monomers).

References 

Carbonate esters
Orthoesters